Charlene Emma Brooks (born 3 May 1981) is an English actress. Known for the infamous role of Janine Butcher in the BBC One soap opera EastEnders which has achieved her much acclaim and success, Brooks has also appeared in British television shows The Bill, Wired and Bleak House, as well as portraying Anna Fallmont in the Network 10 drama Lie With Me. 

Brooks has also won the reality shows Strictly Come Dancing Christmas Special in 2011 and the twelfth series of I'm a Celebrity...Get Me Out of Here!.

Early life
Brooks was born in 1981, in Ware, Hertfordshire, England, and moved to Barmouth, Gwynedd when she was a child. 
Brooks attended Tower House School, in Barmouth, and relocated to London to attend Ravenscourt Theatre School, Hammersmith.

Career
On television, Brooks has appeared in episodes of The Bill, London's Burning, Jonathan Creek and The Demon Headmaster.

After her departure from EastEnders in 2004, Brooks's first role was in the BBC drama Bleak House as Jenny. Brooks has appeared in commercials and voiceovers in the United Kingdom, Europe and the US.

In 2006, Brooks played Beverley Allitt in a BBC1 docu-drama entitled Beverley Allitt: Angel of Death, alongside Ian Kelsey. Producer Cathy Elliot said: "It's a very sensitive issue and of course it's terrible for the parents to have the whole thing brought up. Each time it's brought up it's painful, but a lot of parents realise it's important it's kept in the public domain and that people are aware that things have happened and that not a lot has been done since".

She has guest starred in Robin Hood and Love Soup. In theatre, Brooks, whilst on a break from EastEnders in 2003, appeared in the play Office Games alongside Adam Rickitt. The play was Brooks' West End debut, and described as "a witty and intelligent political commentary". In 2007, she appeared in Our Country's Good at the Liverpool Playhouse.

EastEnders

When executive producer Matthew Robinson re-introduced the character of Janine Butcher in 1999, after Alexia Demetriou left, Brooks secured the role. Brooks remained in the role until May 2004.

In April 2008, Brooks returned to EastEnders for a guest stint. She was later confirmed to be coming back as a regular character. She said, "I had doubts to begin with, mainly because of Kiki, as I know how full-on EastEnders can be, and then there's that stigma about going back to a soap. But I'm so pleased I did, it was the right decision. Especially with what's going on at the moment, I feel really lucky to have a job and I need the security because of Kiki. I was just going to go back for a year, but I had a meeting with the boss last week and we're going to go for another year. So lots more time to get up to much mischief". Executive producer Diederick Santer said, "I couldn't be more pleased that Charlie Brooks is re-joining EastEnders. With her appearances last month, she reminded us what a fine actress she is, and what an intriguing, watchable and engaging character she plays as Janine". She temporarily departed in September 2012, and returned in April 2013 before departing again in March 2014.

In April 2021, it was announced that Brooks had agreed to reprise the role once again for a "huge storyline" and would return later in the year. She made her on-screen return in September 2021. Brooks appeared in her 1,000th episode as Janine on 10 February 2022.

All in a Row 

In January 2019, it was announced that Alex Oates's play All in a Row, starring Brooks as Tamora, the mother, was going to be produced by Paul Virides Productions at the Southwark Playhouse. The play is based on Oates' ten years of experience caring for severely autistic children and adults, and won the Top Five Play Reading at the Bolton Octagon. The play is about the parents of a profoundly autistic eleven year old boy and how they are feeling the night before he is taken to a residential school, when social services feel he needs more support than can be given in their family home.

Criticisms of the play started to emerge when a video trailer for the production was released showing the autistic character, Laurence, portrayed by a puppet. Journalist Frances Ryan, without having seen it, criticised the play by calling it a "grotesque step backwards". The National Autistic Society, who initially decided to help the production by providing consultation, reacted to the Twitter furore by releasing a statement saying "while recognising some of the play's strengths, we decided we could not support the play overall due to its portrayal of autism, particularly the use of a puppet to depict the autistic character alone."

Brooks responded by saying: "I understand people's concerns, but I do urge people to come and see the play first before they judge." She also claimed that having a puppet character is essential and that Laurence, the puppet, is very playful. During rehearsals, Brooks visited the Queensmill School for autistic children in Shepherd's Bush, talking to the pupils, their teachers and carers.  Brooks concluded by stating: "This is a story that is rarely told. I just hope people will come and see it instead of sitting at home getting angry."

Other ventures

Reality television
She won I'm a Celebrity...Get Me Out of Here! in 2012, beating campmate Ashley Roberts. Brooks was "visibly delighted", saying, "[It feels] silly. I never imagined this for a million years. Everyone's been amazing".

Brooks also narrates Botched Up Bodies on Channel 5.

Fitness DVD
Her fitness DVD became the UK's best-selling fitness DVD release, and Brooks was transformed from "podgy Janine to a sexy new mum".

Filmography

Theatre and radio

Awards and nominations

References

External links

 
 

1981 births
Living people
British child actresses
British television actresses
British stage actresses
English soap opera actresses
British radio actresses
I'm a Celebrity...Get Me Out of Here! (British TV series) winners
People educated at the Arts Educational Schools
Actresses from Hertfordshire
People from Ware, Hertfordshire
20th-century British actresses
21st-century British actresses
20th-century English women
20th-century English people
21st-century English women
21st-century English people